Pillar Rock may refer to:

Pillar Rock (Washington)
Pillar Rock (California)
Pillar Rock, a rock formation in England, see Pillar (Lake District)